Ilya Dubkov (born February 17, 1972) is a Russian former professional ice hockey center forward who spent most of his career playing in Scandinavian leagues.

Playing career 

After a year with the Russian team CSKA Moscow, 21-year-old Ilya Dubkov left Russia and moved to Roanoke, Virginia. In Virginia Dubkov played four seasons with Roanoke Express in the ECHL, before getting three appearances with AHL team Hamilton Bulldogs from Hamilton, Ontario, Canada.

After his debut in the AHL, Dubkov - now 25 - was ready to return to Europe. In the 1997-98 season Dubkov was to play for the Danish team Frederikshavn White Hawks, and spent most of the next 13 years in Scandinavia. He stayed with the team until 2002, except for one season in Italy and Russia 2000-2001. The highlight of Dubkov's career in Frederikshavn White Hawks was becoming Danish champion with his team in 2000.

After spending the 2002-03 season in Russia with Krylia Sovetov, it was once again time for Dubkov to return to Scandinavian ice hockey. This time it was time for the center to try something new, and Trondheim Black Panthers from Trondheim, Norway became his team for the next four seasons. Here, he experienced success with Trondheim Black Panthers, winning the bronze medal in 2004 and losing the playoff finals the year after. When the team folded in 2008, Dubkov returned to Denmark for another three years. In addition to two more years with Frederikshavn IK he also spent one season with AaB Ishockey in Aalborg.

Meanwhile, another Trondheim team was about to climb to the elite division (Get-ligaen) of Norwegian ice hockey, and at 37 Dubkov returned to Trondheim in 2009 - a town in which he had become a popular player during his four former years there. This time it was time to help Rosenborg Ishockeyklubb - the "baby brother" of the better known football team Rosenborg BK - and after a strong 4-0 win away against Oslo team Grüner on March 14, 2010 the goal of being promoted to Get-ligaen was reached.

Career statistics

References

External links 

 

1972 births
Living people
AaB Ishockey players
Frederikshavn White Hawks players
Hamilton Bulldogs (AHL) players
HC CSKA Moscow players
Krylya Sovetov Moscow players
Ritten Sport players
Roanoke Express players
Rosenborg IHK players
Russian ice hockey centres
Trondheim Black Panthers players
Ice hockey people from Moscow
Sacramento River Rats players